Kung-Fu Magoo is a 2010 animated action comedy film based on the Mr. Magoo character, created by Millard Kaufman and John Hubley. This film was produced by Classic Media, Ánima Estudios, and Santo Domingo Films. It was also produced by Motion Toons, a new, short-lived animation studio created in conjunction with Ánima Estudios, and Santo Domingo Films. English voice-cast stars Dylan and Cole Sprouse, Alyson Stoner and voice actors Tom Kenny, Rodger Bumpass, Jim Conroy, Chris Parnell, and Maile Flanagan.

The first animated feature featuring Mr. Magoo in more than three decades, and the first U.S.-Mexico co-production for Ánima Estudios, it is written by Emmy Laybourne, Sam Laybourne, Rob Sosin, and Bob Mittenthal and directed by Andrés Couturier.

The film was first released direct-to-DVD in the United States on May 11, 2010, before making its television premiere the following year on Disney XD on February 7, 2011.

Plot

The world's most notorious bad guys are invited to the island fortress of super-villain Tan-Gu (Lloyd Floyd) to compete in an Olympic-style tournament of evil, called the Evilympics. Mr. Quincy Magoo (Jim Conroy) and his 12-year-old nephew Justin (Dylan Sprouse) fight giant robot spiders, ninjas on jet skis, and Tan-Gu's "Beasteen" mutants, as representatives of the anti-evil task force.

Voice cast
 Jim Conroy as Mr. Quincy Magoo, the title character
 Dylan Sprouse as Justin Magoo, Quincy's nephew
 Lloyd Floyd as Tan Gu, the founder of the Evilympics
 Chris Parnell as Cole Fusion, a famous actor/secret agent/good guy who competes at the Evilympics, before deciding that he likes being evil.
 Alyson Stoner as Lorelei Tan Gu, Justin's love interest and daughter of Tan Gu
 Cole Sprouse as Brad Landry, a school bully who picks on Justin
 Rodger Bumpass as General Smith, an army general who plans to launch an attack on the island
 Jim Ward as General Bonkopp, an army general who is against General Smith's launch plan
 Jeff Bennett as Sid, Justin's best friend
 Kenny Mayne as himself
 Tom Kenny as Dr. Malicio
 Maile Flanagan as Orangu-Tammy
 Candi Milo as Gor-Illiana
 Ryan Bollman as Corporal Hayes
 April Stewart as Was-Elizabeth
 Jennifer Hale as Agent L / Leslie Destructo
Additional characters were provided by Wally Wingert, Bob Joles, Fred Travalena, Michael Stanton, Susan Boyajian, and Hope Levy.

Production

Animation
The film's animation was produced by Ánima Estudios in Mexico, while the additional animation was provided by Studio B Productions (now WildBrain) in Canada, and Boulder Media in Ireland.

Release
The project had an early screening at MIPCOM at Cannes, France, in 2008. On May 11, 2010, the English-language version of the film was released on DVD in the United States, distributed by Vivendi Entertainment. The film was also originally set for a theatrical release in Mexico in 2009, distributed by Videocine, but there was no further information regarding this, to date. It instead had its Mexican premiere on Cartoon Network in 2011. The film was dedicated to Alfredo Harp Calderoni, the film's executive producer and son of Mexican businessman, Alfredo Harp Helú, who died after production in 2009.

U.S. broadcasting
On 12 October 2010, the film was acquired by Disney XD for channel transmission and premiered in the United States on 7 February 2011. Produced in Mexico, this marked the first time Disney XD acquired a Latin American animated production for channel transmission.

Reception
This film was panned by critics. S. Jhoanna Robledo of Common Sense Media gave this film 2 out of 5 stars, saying that "the plot, as it were, is nearly nonsensical, but that has always been Mr. Magoo’s charm. Though he wreaks havoc with his obliviousness -- he often walks into a dangerous situation simply because he literally walks into one -- he successfully extricates himself and saves the world in the process. On the face of it, it’s a nostalgic trip to cartoon history -- Magoo  debuted in the late '40s, and the special effects are certainly pre-CGI -- and it's a welcome relief from the relentlessness and inanity of current fare. But if one must be a stickler, it's also kind of mean, what with all the jokes at an elderly person's expense."

Ratings

When it aired on Disney XD on 2 April 2011, it was viewed by 1.6 million viewers among Kids 6-11 (0.5 million/2 rating). In a recent airing, the film was viewed by 254,000 viewers among ages 2 and over, with a 0.2 household rating.

Broadcast history
As of 2018, Kung-Fu Magoo has been broadcast on the following networks:

References

External links
 Kung-Fu Magoo on Classic Media
 

2010 direct-to-video films
2010 films
Mr. Magoo
American animated comedy films
2010 action comedy films
2010s American animated films
Kung fu films
American flash animated films
Mexican animated films
Direct-to-video animated films
Films about Mexican Americans
2010s sports comedy films
Ánima Estudios films
Animation based on real people
2010 comedy films
2010s English-language films
2010s Mexican films